A sextet (or hexad) is a formation containing exactly six members. The former term is commonly associated with vocal ensembles (e.g. The King's Singers, Affabre Concinui) or musical instrument groups, but can be applied to any situation where six similar or related objects are considered a single unit.

Musical compositions with six parts are sextets. Many musical compositions are named for the number of musicians for which they are written. If a piece is written for six performers, it may be called a "sextet". Steve Reich's "Sextet", for example, is written for six percussionists. However, much as many string quartets do not include "string quartet" in the title (though many do), many sextets do not include "sextet" in their title. See: string sextet and piano sextet.

In jazz music a sextet is any group of six players, usually containing a drum set (bass drum, snare drum, hi-hat, ride cymbal), string bass or electric bass, piano, and various combinations of the following or other instruments: guitar, trumpet, saxophone, clarinet, trombone.

In heavy metal and rock music, a sextet typically contains, but is not restricted to, a lead vocalist, two guitarists, a bassist, drummer, and keyboardist.

In classical music
Antonín Dvořák
String Sextet in A major
Pyotr Ilyich Tchaikovsky
Souvenir de Florence
Lennox Berkeley
Sextet for Clarinet, Horn, and String Quartet
John Ireland
Sextet for Clarinet, Horn, and String Quartet
Francis Poulenc
Sextet for Flute, Oboe, Clarinet, Bassoon, Horn, and Piano
Ernst von Dohnányi
Sextet for Clarinet, Horn, String Trio, and Piano
Krzysztof Penderecki
Sextet for Clarinet, Horn, String Trio, and Piano

In rock, heavy metal, and hip hop

The Allman Brothers Band
Amaranthe
Bleeding Through
Blondie
Butcher Babies
Chimaira
Cradle of Filth
Dark Tranquillity (since 1998)
Delain
The Devil Wears Prada
Dimmu Borgir
The Doobie Brothers
Electric Six
Epica
Fleshgod Apocalypse
Foo Fighters
Foreigner
GFriend
Grandmaster Flash and the Furious Five
Guns N' Roses (1990–1998)
Haken 
The Human League (1981–1995)
Ill Niño
INXS
Iron Maiden (since 1999)
Jackson 5 (1975–1976, 1983–1985)
Jefferson Airplane

Kansas
King Crimson
King Gizzard & the Lizard Wizard (since 2020)
Leaves' Eyes
Linkin Park
Mink DeVille
Nappy Roots
Neurosis
New Edition
Nightwish
Procol Harum
The Pussycat Dolls (2008–2010, 2019–2022 quintet)
Rammstein
Mayday Parade
Soilwork
Styx
Success Will Write Apocalypse Across the Sky
The Birthday Massacre
Underoath
Whitechapel
Whitesnake

References

Types of musical groups
 
6